In enzymology, a taurine-2-oxoglutarate transaminase is an enzyme that catalyzes the chemical reaction.

taurine + 2-oxoglutarate  sulfoacetaldehyde + L-glutamate

Thus, the two substrates of this enzyme are taurine and 2-oxoglutarate, whereas its two products are sulfoacetaldehyde and L-glutamate.

This enzyme belongs to the family of transferases, specifically the transaminases, which transfer nitrogenous groups.  The systematic name of this enzyme class is taurine:2-oxoglutarate aminotransferase. Other names in common use include taurine aminotransferase, taurine transaminase, taurine-alpha-ketoglutarate aminotransferase, and taurine-glutamate transaminase.  This enzyme participates in beta-alanine metabolism.  It employs one cofactor, pyridoxal phosphate.

References

 
 

EC 2.6.1
Pyridoxal phosphate enzymes
Enzymes of unknown structure